Caitlin Elizabeth Marnell (born September 10, 1982) is an American writer and media commentator based in New York City. She was a beauty editor at Lucky and XoJane, wrote a column for Vice, and has also written for Self, Nylon, and Glamour. She is the author of the New York Times bestselling memoir How To Murder Your Life, which was published in 2017.

Early life
Marnell was born on September 10, 1982 in Washington, D.C. She was named after Caitlin Thomas. Her mother is a psychotherapist and her father is a psychiatrist. At 15, Marnell began attending Lawrence Academy in Groton, Massachusetts. She was a strong student academically, but at 17 was expelled weeks before graduation. She finished high school at Emerson Preparatory School in Northwest Washington, D.C. After moving to New York, she attended The New School in Greenwich Village to study nonfiction writing.

Career

Lucky
While attending The New School, Marnell interned at beauty magazines, eventually earning the title of beauty assistant at Lucky in 2007. She attended rehab in Connecticut for a month, and when she returned she was promoted to associate beauty editor. She worked at Lucky for two and a half years before quitting after failed attempts at sobriety. After overdosing in her apartment and spending two weeks at Bellevue in 2011, she said she "vowed never, ever to lie to a job again: they could take me or leave me with my drug stuff."

XoJane
Shortly after being released, she was hired by Jane Pratt to become beauty and health director of XoJane. Her writing was "shrouded in irreverent yet deeply personal anecdotes" with frequent references to her drug use, hospitalizations, and mental illnesses. She first received widespread attention when she wrote about using emergency contraception as her primary birth control, which spread through Twitter. Her position was controversial – Anna David at The Fix wrote that Marnell "wins applause for her bravery" in speaking openly about drug use, while Hamilton Nolan at Gawker described her as a "dust-smoking suicidal narcissist downtown swinger beauty columnist". She had problems writing regularly which frustrated Pratt – in April 2012, the publisher of XoJane ordered Marnell into rehab. In June 2012, she wrote to the New York Post confirming that she had quit, writing in part that she "couldn’t spend another summer meeting deadlines behind a computer at night when I could be on the rooftop of Le Bain looking for shooting stars and smoking angel dust".

Vice
Just days after her open letter, Marnell was hired by Vice for a column called "Amphetamine Logic". Described as darker than her previous work, it focused around Marnell's drug use and day-to-day life. In November, she went to rehab in Thailand on assignment for Vice but did not write anything. When she returned, she began taking drugs again and wrote final goodbye columns for Vice in September 2012 and January 2013. Altogether, she wrote 11 articles in the series.

How to Murder Your Life
In March 2013, the New York Post reported that Marnell had reached a book deal with Simon & Schuster worth up to half a million dollars. The publishing house confirmed the deal but declined to address the estimated figure. It was reported that Marnell's memoir would chronicle her "sexual and narcotic adventures" and her "drug-fueled rise" through Condé Nast, xoJane, and Vice. How to Murder Your Life was released on January 31, 2017 in the United States and became an instant New York Times bestseller. The New York Times Book Review called the memoir a "success".

Audiobook
In October 2019 Marnell released Self-Tanner for the Soul  with Audible, recounting her European escapades with XL Airways UK.

See also
Team Facelift
Lucky (magazine)
Nimrod Kamer

References

American fashion journalists
1982 births
Living people
Writers from Washington, D.C.
The New School alumni